Metro Toronto Community Services was a department within the former  Regional Municipality of Metropolitan Toronto.

The department was responsible for a variety of community-related services not provided by the local municipalities:

 social services
 welfare
 hostels and shelters
 community services

The department was headed by the Commissioner of Community Services.

This department is now under Toronto Community Services.

Community Services